Blake Davis (born 1992) is an Australian actor.
Davis’ most noted TV roles have been in Tangle (as Max Williams) and Dead Gorgeous (as Jonathan). In 2011, he starred as Richie in the ABC series The Slap, which is based on the 2008 novel by Australian author Christos Tsiolkas. In 2012, Blake appeared in the third season of Tangle.

Filmography
 The Slap (2011) – Richie
 Dead Gorgeous (2010) – Jonathon
 Tangle (2009–present) – Max Williams
 Rush (2008) – Daniel (one episode)
 Bed of Roses (2008) – Will (two episodes)
 Blue Heelers (2005) – Clarke Thompson  (one episode)

Theatre
 8 (Her Majesty's Theatre and Sydney Town Hall, 2012) – Elliot Perry
 All About My Mother (MTC, 2010) – Esteban

References

Australian male film actors
Australian male stage actors
Australian male television actors
Living people
21st-century Australian male actors
1992 births